La Ferté-en-Ouche (literally La Ferté in Ouche) is a commune in the department of Orne, northwestern France. The municipality was established on 1 January 2016 by merger of the former communes of Anceins, Bocquencé, Couvains, La Ferté-Frênel (the seat), Gauville, Glos-la-Ferrière, Heugon, Monnai, Saint-Nicolas-des-Laitiers and Villers-en-Ouche.

See also 
Communes of the Orne department

References 

Communes of Orne
Populated places established in 2016
2016 establishments in France
States and territories established in 2016